Five is the fifth studio album and Napalm Records debut by Canadian metal band the Agonist. Five is the band's second full-length album with Vicky Psarakis as the band's vocalist. The album was released on September 30, 2016.

Track listing

Personnel
Vicky Psarakis – vocals
Danny Marino – lead guitar
Pascal "Paco" Jobin – rhythm guitar
Chris Kells – bass
Simon McKay – drums

Charts

References

2016 albums
Napalm Records albums
The Agonist albums